Beri may refer to:

People
 One of several Biblical names, meaning "my son" or "my corn"

Groups
 Zaghawa people, an African ethnic group

Individuals
 Beri Thimappa, an interpreter for the British East India Company
 Beri Weber, an American singer
 Ritu Beri, an Indian fashion designer

Places

India
 Beri, Jhajjar, a town in the Jhajjar district of Haryana
 Beri, Rajasthan, a village 
 Beri State, a former princely state of northern India with capital in the above town

Elsewhere
 Beri Kolon Forest Park, Gambia
 Beri, Iran, a village in West Azerbaijan Province
 Beri, Podgorica, Montenegro

Other uses
 Gurdwara Beri Sahib, a gurdwara in Sialkot, Pakistan, also known as Baba Beri

See also
 Bery (disambiguation)
 Berry (disambiguation)
 Berri (disambiguation)
 Berry, a small fruit
 Beriberi, a set of symptoms caused by a nutritional deficit in vitamin B1

ru:Бери (значения)